Musopen is a 501(c)(3) non-profit organization which hosts and provides public domain music via sheet music and recordings. It is located in Tarzana, California, launched by Aaron Dunn in 2005.

Mission and charitable activities 
Musopen provides an online library of public domain music recordings and sheet music.  It also raises money to finance classical music recordings which are released into the public domain.

In 2008, Musopen released newly commissioned recordings of the 32 Beethoven piano sonatas into the public domain.

In 2010, the site organized a fundraiser via Kickstarter to commission recordings of a larger repertoire, raising a total of $68,359, more than six times their initial target of $11,000. In July 2012, Musopen announced that the editing of the recordings was finished, after which the audio files were uploaded to its website and Archive.org. The final list of music was announced in August 2012.

In September 2013, a new Kickstarter fundraiser was launched by Musopen to record the complete works of Frédéric Chopin. The fundraiser was successful, exceeding the funding goal of $75,000 by over $15,000. All recording for this project has been finished and editing was completed in April 2015.

Online music library 
Musopen operates under a freemium model, in that some content is available free of charge, but premium downloads (HD) require a subscription. Sheet music is available for download to all for free, and recordings can be played using an HTML5 player. Non-paying users can download music recordings but are restricted to 5 downloads per day; members paying $55 per year receive unlimited downloads of losslessly encoded music; and "benefactors" paying $240 per year may in addition request recordings (as of October 2018).

See also
 Open Goldberg Variations

References

External links 

 
 

Kickstarter projects
Online music and lyrics databases
Public domain music
Tarzana, Los Angeles
Internet properties established in 2005
2005 establishments in California
Organizations based in Los Angeles County, California